A chort (Russian: чёрт, Belarusian and Ukrainian: чорт, Serbo-Croatian čort or črt,  Polish: czort and czart, Czech and Slovak: čert, Slovene: črt) is an anthropomorphic malign spirit or demon in Slavic folk tradition. Chorts are often depicted identically to Christian devils, with horns, hooves, and a skinny tail. In Slavic mythology, a singular Chort is sometimes identified as a son of the god Chernobog and the goddess Mara. Likewise, in Ukraine mythology, Chorts were originally the priest of Chernobog. In folk Christianity, they are considered lesser minions of Satan.

Compare to Russian sayings (curses) "тысяча чертей" ("tysjača čertej") – meaning thousands of demons; "чёрт побери" ("čort poberi") – meaning "be taken by the demon" (often used as an exclamation to express frustration or pain as in English "darn!", "rats!", "shit!", etc), the saying is often used as an acceptable version of cursing in Eastern Europe; "чёрт попутал" ("čort poputal") – meaning mixed up by the demon; "к чертям" ("k čertjam") – meaning to hell, and many others.

Etymology
There are many theories regarding the origins of the Proto-Slavic word *čьrtъ. One is that it is a substantivized t-participle of *ker- (to cut, to chop), which could be derived from a chort imagined as being lame (having one leg shorter). The words like Ukrainian kutsiy and Czech and Slovak kusý, also derived from *ker-, are one of chort's most common epithets. According to a more recent hypothesis, Proto-Slavic *čьrtъ represents a derivative of *čersti / čьrtǫ ‘to draw a line, furrow’. One way to interpret this derivation is reconstructing *čьrtъ as a supernatural Draughtsman in charge of determining human fate. Under this hypothesis, the original god of destiny came to be perceived as the bringer of death and then syncretised with the embodiment of all evil in the Christian tradition. The Polish version of the word, czart, is notably similar to the proto-germanic -swarta, which means black.

In Czech and Slovak culture 
In Czech and Slovak folk tales, čert is not an evil character per se. It is often trying to tease characters in selling their souls in exchange for something (money, power, completion of a task). This often ends badly for evil or greedy characters, who are tricked into getting useless gifts and then are carried into hell. Other times, čert changes roles from trickster to tricked as he loses a bet against a hero, who outsmarts him, winning his soul back. This way, čert is often tricked to build castle walls in a day, dig fish ponds or even whole river banks, move large stones or create hills and mountains. Sometimes, a positive role of čert is further emphasized, namely in modern or modernized folk tales. Čert is trying to bring evil characters to hell, he often helps or befriends heroes in this process and gives them various magical items and treasures.

The true form of Čert is often a smallish hairy man with a tail, horns and one or two hoofs. But he is a shapeshifter and he tries to trick characters in his nicer forms, before they even realize what he is. In these forms, he is often represented as pretty young man, count, or huntsman (see The Devil and Kate). Often, this transformation is not (and cannot be) complete, so one can recognize čert by small horns hidden in black curly hair, or a single hoofed leg hidden in high boots.

Čert is not the devil, although they might have a lot in common. Sometimes, hell is full of čerts and is ruled by the devil (or archdevil) Lucifer.

In Turkic culture

In Turkic (usually neighboring Slavic) folklore its name is "Çor" (Chor). In Anatolia known as "Çorabaş" (Chorabash). Chors are spiritual creatures mentioned in the pre-Islamic texts and oral tradition who inhabit an unseen world in dimensions beyond the visible universe of humans. Influenced by the later influences of Islamic jinn and devils, folk narratives mentions that the Chors are made of fire, but also physical in nature, being able to interact physically with people and objects and likewise be acted upon. Like human beings, the Chor can also be good (Ak-çor, literally "White Chor"), evil (Kara-çor, "Black Chor"), or neutrally benevolent like humans. The exorcist is called "Çoraman" (Choraman) in Anatolia. There are two different kinds of Chura: Arçura, that comes from the forest and is married to the Orman iyesi, and Biçura, that comes from the cellar and is married to Ev iyesi.

See also

 Bies
 Chernobog and Belobog
 Krampus
 Companions of Saint Nicholas

References

Bibliography
 Афанасьев А. Н. «Поэтические воззрения славян на природу». — М.: 1865−1869. — Том 3, глава 22

External links
 The name of the city Çorum (Çorum İlinin Adı) 
 Çorum Adının Menşei  

Slavic demons
Devils